Oh Seung-bum  (Hangul: 오승범; born 26 February 1981) is a  former South Korean footballer, who played as midfielder for Gangwon FC in K League 1. 

His previous clubs include Seongnam Ilhwa, Gwangju Sangmu (military service), Pohang Steelers, Jeju United and Chungju Hummel.

Career 
His career started at Seongnam Ilhwa in 1999, he spent five years with the Seongnam Ilhwa. In the meanwhile, he moved to Gwangju Sangmu to fulfill his compulsory military duties, where he stayed until 2003 season. In 2005, he moved to Pohang Steelers. Two years later he moved to hometown team Jeju United. At January 2015, he signed to Chungju Hummel.

External links 
Jeju United Official website

1981 births
Living people
South Korean footballers
K League 1 players
Seongnam FC players
Pohang Steelers players
Jeju United FC players
Chungju Hummel FC players
Gangwon FC players
K League 2 players
Association football midfielders
Sportspeople from Jeju Province